Eba Station is a Hiroden terminal station on the Hiroden Eba Line located in Eba-nishi, Naka-ku, Hiroshima. A streetcar and bus depot is located behind the station. The station is operated by the Hiroshima Electric Railway.

Routes
There are three routes that serve Eba Station:
 Hiroshima Station - Eba Route
 Yokogawa Station - Eba Route
 Hakushima - Eba Route

Station layout
The station consists of two side platforms serving two tracks. There is a large shelter located on the outbound platform.

Adjacent stations

Bus connections
Hiroden Bus Route #6 at Hiroden Eba Office bus stop

Surrounding area
Hiroshima City Ebayama Museum of Meteorology
Mitsubishi Heavy Industries Hiroshima Machinery Works
Hiroden Eba-shako - (streetcar and bus shed)
Hiroden Eba Office
Hiroshima City Eba Junior High School
Hiroshima Municipal Eba Elementary School
Eba Shrine

History
Opened on June 20, 1944.
Renamed to "Eba-guchi" on November 1, 1947.
Moved on January 7, 1954 when the train and bus shed was built.
Renamed to "Eba" in 1963.

References

See also

Hiroden Streetcar Lines and Routes

Eba Station
Railway stations in Japan opened in 1944